Marita nitida is a species of sea snail, a marine gastropod mollusk in the family Mangeliidae.

Description
The length of the shell attains 7.5 mm, its diameter 3 mm.

The small, thin shell is translucent, glossy and narrow-ovate. Its colour is white, with a few faint rusty spots. It contains 5½ whorls, two of which compose the protoconch.

Sculpture  The radials are elevate narrow spaced ribs—on the first adult whorl eleven, on the body whorl eight. Between these ribs are incised spiral lines, increasing from six on the first adult whorl to about twenty-four on the last.

Aperture :—The aperture is narrow. The varix is slight. The sinus  is indefinite.

Distribution
This marine species is endemic to Australia and occurs off South Australia.

References

External links
  Tucker, J.K. 2004 Catalog of recent and fossil turrids (Mollusca: Gastropoda). Zootaxa 682:1-1295.
 

nitida
Gastropods described in 1922
Gastropods of Australia